Rodolfo Omar López Romero (born September 18, 1983) is a Mexican former professional boxer who competed from 2000 to 2014. He held the WBC featherweight title in 2006.

López captured the WBC featherweight title with a victory over Takashi Koshimoto but lost the belt in his first defense to former champion In-Jin Chi. Scores were 117–111, 116–112 and 116–113.

See also 
 List of featherweight boxing champions
 List of WBC world champions
List of Mexican boxing world champions

References

External links 

 

1983 births
Featherweight boxers
Living people
Boxers from Quintana Roo
People from Cancún
World featherweight boxing champions
World boxing champions
Mexican male boxers